Gashed Senses & Crossfire is the fourth full-length studio album by Canadian industrial artist Front Line Assembly.  The song "Shutdown" features a clip of dialogue taken from the beginning of the 1987 film Hamburger Hill.

Release
In October 2019, Canadian label Artoffact started a crowdfunding campaign in order to obtain the album licenses and to re-release the album on vinyl on May 4, 2020.

Singles

"Digital Tension Dementia"
 "Digital Tension Dementia" (7:15)
 "Vexation" (8:23)
 "Big Money (Remix)" (4:15)
"Digital Tension Dementia" is the first single by Front Line Assembly and the first single taken from Gashed Senses & Crossfire. The single was released in November 1988 on Third Mind in the United Kingdom and Belgium and in the United States via Wax Trax! Records. It was their first Billboard chart appearance in the U.S.

"No Limit (Damaged Goods Remix)"
 "No Limit (Damaged Goods Remix)" (7:38)
 "Lethal Compound (Harmful If Swallowed Mix)" (11:08)
 "No Limit (Spontaneous Combustion Mix)" (5:27)
"No Limit" is the second single from the album.

Reception

Billboard listed "Digital Tension Dementia" in its single reviews in the recommended section, which signifies "records with potential for significant chart action".

Track listing

Personnel

Front Line Assembly
 Bill Leeb – production, vocals, electronic instruments
 Michael Balch – production, engineering (1, 6, 7), electronic instruments

Additional musicians
 Dave Hall – bass (9)

Technical personnel
 Anthony Valcic – engineering (1, 6, 7)
 Dave Coppenhall – artwork

Chart positions

Digital Tension Dementia

References

Front Line Assembly albums
1989 albums
Wax Trax! Records albums
Third Mind Records albums
Roadrunner Records albums